Blenkinsop Hall is a privately owned castellated 19th-century country house situated on the banks of the Tipalt Burn near Greenhead, Northumberland. The legal address of the property is Haltwhistle, Northumberland, NE49 9LY. It is a Grade II listed building. The property is located near Blenkinsopp Castle which is primarily a ruin; the castle was owned by the same family as the Hall for generations.

History
The earliest recorded history of this locale is from the Roman occupation and the construction of Hadrian's Wall, some of whose remains are extant in the vicinity to the north.

County records from the reign of Henry III of England state that the land was owned by Ralph Blenkinsop during that era; there was no indication of any building on the site at that time.

A house known as Dryburnhaugh stood on the site by the 17th century, and was owned by the ancient Blenkinsop family of nearby Blenkinsop and Bellister castles.

A history of the region published in 1840 specifies that John Blenkinsop owned Dryburnhaugh as of 1663 and that Thomas Blenkinsop was the owner as of 1712.

The estates passed to the Coulson family by the 1727 marriage of Jane Blenkinsop, the heiress, to William Coulson. His son, Colonel John Blenkinsop Coulson built the present two-storeyed, five-bayed house on the site in about 1800. In about 1835, the property was improved with the assistance of architect John Dobson. A south-east tower and stables were added, and the interior was modified; the tower was subsequently removed. The historic Listing summary filed in 1967 states that circa 1877, parapets and a porch were added and the rear of the building was rebuilt.

Edward Joicey purchased all the Blenkinsop estates including the Hall in July 1875 and since then, the hall has been owned by some member of his family, most recently Fiona Lees-Millais (née Joicey) and her husband (as of August 2020); they have owned the property since 2001.

As of 2020, the yard contained "two cottages, six working stables, an office and a game larder", according to Country Life (magazine). That summer, Blenkinsop Hall was listed for sale; it included "11 estate houses and cottages". Country Life reported that "the interior is largely original and includes four main reception rooms, 10 bedrooms, four bathrooms, a conservatory and an integral flat".

See also
Hadrian's Wall
Stanegate

References

Bibliography
 A History of Northumberland (1840) John Hodgson Pt 2 Vol 3 pp133–4

Country houses in Northumberland
Grade II listed buildings in Northumberland